The United States census of 1900, conducted by the Census Office on June 1, 1900, determined the resident population of the United States to be 76,212,168, an increase of 21.01% from the 62,979,766 persons enumerated during the 1890 census.

The census saw the nation's largest city, New York City, more than double in size due to the consolidation with Brooklyn, becoming in the process the first U.S. city to record a population growth of over three million.

Census questions

The 1900 census collected the following information:
 address
 name
 relationship to head of family
 sex
 race (listed as "Color or race" on the census)
 age, month and year born
 marital status and, if married, number of years married
 for women, number of children born and number now living
 place of birth of person, and their parents
 if foreign born, year of immigration and whether naturalized
 occupation
 months not employed
 school
 ability to speak English
 whether on a farm  farmer
 home owned or rented, and, if owned, whether mortgaged

Full documentation for the 1900 census, including census forms and enumerator instructions, is available from  the Integrated Public Use Microdata Series.

Data availability
The original census enumeration sheets were microfilmed by the Census Bureau in the 1940s, after which the original sheets were destroyed. The microfilmed census is available in rolls from the National Archives and Records Administration. Several organizations also host images of the microfilmed census online, and digital indices.

Microdata from the 1900 census are freely available through the Integrated Public Use Microdata Series. Aggregate data for small areas, together with electronic boundary files, can be downloaded from the National Historical Geographic Information System.

State rankings

City rankings

References

External links 

 1901 U.S Census Report (contains 1900 census results)
 Historic US Census data
 http://census.gov/population/www/censusdata/PopulationofStatesandCountiesoftheUnitedStates1790-1990.pdf

United States Census, 1900
United States census
United States